The Akron Gymnasium, at W. 4th St. & Custer Ave. in Akron, Colorado, was built during 1938–40.  It was designed by Eugene G. Groves and built by the Works Progress Administration.  It has also been known as the Washington County High School Gymnasium.  It was listed on the National Register of Historic Places in 2008.

It was abandoned for many years, but was deemed significant for its association with the WPA and with the community of Akron, a small town of 1,400 population in 1940.

References

Gyms in the United States
Sports venues on the National Register of Historic Places in Colorado
Late 19th and Early 20th Century American Movements architecture
Sports venues completed in 1940
Buildings and structures in Washington County, Colorado
1940s architecture in the United States
Works Progress Administration in Colorado
National Register of Historic Places in Washington County, Colorado
School buildings on the National Register of Historic Places in Colorado